Yon is a given name and a surname.

Notable people with the name include:

Given name
 Yon García (born 1979), Spanish former figure skater and five-time Spanish national champion
 Yon Goicoechea (born 1984), Venezuelan lawyer and political activist
 Yon González (born 1986), Spanish actor
 Pak Yǒn, Korean name taken by shipwrecked Dutch sailor Jan Jansz. Weltevree (1595-?)
 Yon Soriano (born 1987), Dominican sprinter
 Yon Tumarkin (born 1989), Israeli actor and singer
 Yon (fl. 1996-2011), a captive Iriomote cat

Surname
 Yon Hyong-muk (1931-2005), North Korean politician and Prime Minister of North Korea 
 Marco Yon (1929-1970), Guatemalan revolutionary
 Michael Yon (born 1964), American writer and photographer
 Pietro Yon (1886–1943), Italian organist and composer
 Tom A. Yon (1882-1971), American politician
 Simon "Yon" Hall, a member of the Australian musical comedy trio Tripod